The 2020–21 EFL Cup was the 61st season of the EFL Cup (known as the Carabao Cup for sponsorship reasons), the competition is open to all clubs participating in the Premier League and the English Football League.

Manchester City were the three-time defending champions, having retained the trophy in 2020, defeating Aston Villa in the final at Wembley Stadium in London on 1 March 2020. This was the first season that the winner of the competition qualified for the play-off round of the newly introduced UEFA Europa Conference League rather than the second qualifying round of the UEFA Europa League. It was also the first season where the semi-finals were single matches, instead of two-legged fixtures.

Manchester City won a fourth consecutive title, defeating Tottenham Hotspur 1–0 in the final and equalling Liverpool's overall tally of eight titles.

Access
All 92 clubs in the Premier League and English Football League entered the season's EFL Cup. Access was distributed across the top 4 leagues of the English football league system. For the first two rounds, the draw was regionalised into northern and southern clubs.

In the first round, 22 of 24 Championship clubs and all League One, and League Two clubs entered.

The following round, the two remaining Championship clubs Bournemouth
and Watford (who finished 18th and 19th respectively in the 2019–20 Premier League season), and the Premier League clubs not involved in either the Champions League or Europa League entered.

Arsenal, Chelsea, Leicester City, Liverpool, Manchester City, Manchester United and Tottenham Hotspur all received byes to the third round owing to their participation in European competitions.

First round
A total of 70 clubs played in the first round: 24 from League Two (tier 4), 24 from League One (tier 3), and 22 from the Championship (tier 2). The draw for this round was split on a geographical basis into 'northern' and 'southern' sections. Teams were drawn against a team from the same section. Matches were played on the weekend of 5 September 2020, however some matches were moved a week earlier due to that weekend being a FIFA international window. The draw was conducted on Sky Sports News by Paul Merson on 18 August 2020.

Northern section

Southern section

Second round
A total of 50 teams played in the second round; the 35 winners from the first round were joined with Bournemouth and Watford from the Championship, as well as the 13 Premier League clubs that were not involved in European competitions. The draw for this round was split on a geographical basis into 'northern' and 'southern' sections. Teams were drawn against a team from the same section. The draw was made on 6 September 2020 by Phil Babb. The ties were played on the week commencing 14 September 2020.

Northern section

Southern section

Third round
A total of 32 teams played in this round. Arsenal, Chelsea, Leicester City, Liverpool, Manchester City, Manchester United, and Tottenham Hotspur entered in this round due to their European qualification and would join the 25 winners of the second round. The draw was made on 6 September 2020 by Phil Babb. The ties were played on the week commencing 21 September 2020.

Originally set for 22 September 2020, the tie between Leyton Orient and Tottenham Hotspur was postponed after multiple Orient players tested positive for COVID-19. On 25 September, it was confirmed that Tottenham had received a bye into the fourth round, due to Orient's inability to fulfil the fixture.

Fourth round
A total of 16 teams played in this round. The draw was conducted on 17 September 2020 by Laura Woods and Lee Hendrie live on Sky Sports. The ties were played on the week commencing 28 September 2020. League Two side Newport County was the only club from the bottom two divisions of the EFL to participate in this round.

Quarter-finals
Eight teams played in this round. The draw was conducted on 1 October 2020 following the Liverpool v Arsenal match live on Sky Sports and was made by Jamie Redknapp. The ties were played on the week commencing 21 December 2020. Championship sides Brentford and Stoke City were the only non-Premier League clubs to participate in this round.

Semi-finals
Four teams played in this round. The draw was conducted on 23 December 2020 following the Everton v Manchester United match live on Sky Sports and was made by Darren Bent. This round was played on a single-leg basis like the rest of the tournament (in previous years the semi-finals were two-legged home and away fixtures). Championship side Brentford were the only non-Premier League club to participate in this round.

Final 

The final was played on 25 April 2021 at Wembley Stadium, having been rescheduled from 28 February 2021.

Top goalscorers

Notes

References

EFL Cup seasons
EFL Cup
EFL Cup
Cup